Torry may refer to the following
 Torry an area within the city of Aberdeen, Scotland
 Torry (name), a list of people with this surname, nickname and given name

See also

 Terry (disambiguation)
 Torcy (disambiguation)
 Torr (disambiguation)
 Torre (disambiguation)
 Torrey (disambiguation)
 Torri (disambiguation)
 Tory (disambiguation)
 Torry Academy, former secondary school in Torry, Aberdeen
 Torry Battery, artillery battery in Torry, Aberdeen
 Torry Burn (disambiguation)
 Torry freshness, a fish freshness scoring system
 Torry Hill, family estate in Kent, England
 Torry Hill Railway, miniature railway in Kent, England
 Torry-Crittendon Farmhouse is a historic home in Greene County, New York.
 USS Torry (AKL-11), United States Navy cargo ship